Hibbertia sessiliflora is a species of flowering plant in the family Dilleniaceae and is endemic to south-eastern continental Australia. It is a small, sparsely hairy shrub with thin, low-lying branches, elliptic to lance-shaped leaves and yellow flowers with four to six stamens in a single cluster on one side of two hairy carpels.

Description
Flowering mostly occurs from September to November.

Taxonomy
Hibbertia sessiliflora was first formally described in 1995 by Hellmut R. Toelken in the Journal of the Adelaide Botanic Gardens from specimens he collected near Dergholm.

Distribution and habitat
This hibbertia grows in heath and woodland in a restricted area near the border between South Australia and Victoria.

See also
List of Hibbertia species

References

sessiliflora
Flora of South Australia
Flora of Victoria (Australia)
Plants described in 1995
Taxa named by Hellmut R. Toelken